Suilliinae is a subfamily of flies in the family Heleomyzidae. The two genera in this subfamily were formerly placed the subfamily Heleomyzinae, but they are now considered to make up a subfamily of their own.

Description
Suilliinae differ from other Heleomyzidae in that their orbital plates angle inward, away from the inner margins of the eyes. They are often associated with fungi.

Taxonomy
Suilliinae contains the following genera:
 Suillia (= Allophyla)
 Porsenus

References

Heleomyzidae
Diptera subfamilies